The 2001 Bulldogs RLFC season was the 67th in the club's history. Coached by Steve Folkes and captained by Darren Britt, they competed in the National Rugby League's 2001 Telstra Premiership, finishing the regular season 2nd. The team went on to the Semi-finals after losing the semi-final game 10-52 against the Cronulla Sharks at the Sydney Football Stadium.

Squad movement

Gains

Debuts
Royce Simms

Losses

Left club/did not play in 2001
Daryl Halligan
Gavin Lester
James Pickering
Nathan Sologinkin
Ricky Stuart

Fixtures

Regular season

Finals season

Player statistics

Source=

Notes
 Age = Age at the end of 2001
 App = Starting appearances
 Int = Interchange appearances
 T = Tries
 G = Goals
 FG = Field Goals
 Pts = Points

Representatives

See also
 List of Canterbury-Bankstown Bulldogs seasons

References

Canterbury-Bankstown Bulldogs seasons
Canterbury-Bankstown Bulldogs season